"July Morning" is a song by the English rock band Uriah Heep. It is the third track on their 1971 album Look at Yourself.

The song was written in July 1970 by the band's keyboardist Ken Hensley and lead singer, David Byron. 

The song is written in the key of C minor. The song has four verses and four choruses, featuring an organ introduction and a guitar solo. There is a guitar bridge between the first and second parts of the song.

AllMusic contributor Dave Thompson described the song as the best produced by Uriah Heep, with a "magnificent arrangement and performance", and in 1995, Radiomafia added "July Morning" to their list of "Top 500 Songs".

"July Morning" was first released on the Look at Yourself album and as a single in Japan and Venezuela. The Venezuelan single split the song across both sides of the 7", while the Japanese single featured an edited version of the song, which was later released on the band's greatest hits album Your Turn to Remember in 2016. 
The live version from Uriah Heep Live was released as a single in the US. In 2009 the band released a new version of the song on the album Celebration.

Uriah Heep's manager Gerry Bron thought Manfred Mann not only played an important part in the original studio recording, but also played a crucial role in its development.

Other performances

Soviet group VIA Iveria recorded the song on their 1975 album Iveria.
Hideki Saijo西城秀樹(1955~2018), a Japanese singer and an actor performed the song in his solo stadium concert『BIG GAME '80』in Tokyo and Osaka in Japan. https://ja.wikipedia.org/wiki/BIG_GAME%2780_HIDEKI
German heavy metal guitarist Axel Rudi Pell recorded this song on his album The Masquerade Ball in 2000.
On BBC Radio's Friday Rock Show, Tommy Vance played "July Morning" in tribute of David Byron.
Every year on 30 June in Bulgaria, people from all over the country travel to the Black Sea coast to watch the sunrise on 1 July. During the event people often sing "July Morning". Until his death in 2021, John Lawton performed the song at these events, backed by the Bulgarian band BTR.
Polish band Kult covered this song on remastered version of their album Kaseta.

Other appearances
The song has been appeared on many Uriah Heep live, compilation and studio albums and videos.

Uriah Heep Live - 1973
The Best of Uriah Heep - 1976
Live in Europe - 1987
Live in Moscow - 1988
The Collection - 1989
Still 'Eavy Still Proud - 1994
Platinum: The Ultimate Collection - 1995
A Time of Revelation - 1996
The Best of... Part 1 - 1996
King Biscuit Flower Hour Presents Uriah Heep in Concert - 1997
Rock Progression - 1998
Classic Heep: An Anthology - 1998
Three Classic Albums: ...Very 'Eavy ...Very 'Umble, Salisbury, Look at Yourself - 1998
The Best of Pts. 1-2 - 1999
Travellers in Time: An Anthology Vol. 1 - 1999
Future Echoes of the Past - 2001
20th Century Masters - The Millennium Collection: The Best of Uriah Heep - 2001
Electrically Driven - 2001
Sailing the Sea of Light - 2001
Radio Caroline Calling 70's Flashback - 2001
Remasters: The Official Anthology - 2001
The Box Miniatures - 2002
The Magician's Birthday Party - 2002
Two Sides of Uriah Heep - 2003
The Ultimate Collection - 2003
Revelations: The Uriah Heep Anthology - 2004
Gold: Looking Back 1970-2001 - 2004
From the Front Row... Live! - 2004
The Anthology - 2004
Best of Symfo Rock - 2005
Chapter & Verse - 2005
Between Two Worlds - 2005
Wake Up: The Singles Collection - 2006
Bird of Prey: Best of Uriah Heep - 2006
Easy Livin': Singles A's & B's - 2006
Very Best of Uriah Heep - 2006
Celebration - 2009
Live at Sweden Rock - 2010
Wizards: The Best of Uriah Heep - 2011
Live in Armenia - 2011
Official Bootleg Vol. 3: Live in Kawasaki in Japan 2010 - 2011
Official Bootleg - 2011
Official Bootleg Vol. 4: Live From Brisbane 2011 - 2011
Official Bootleg Vol. 2: Live in Budapest Hungary 2010 - 2011
Uriah Heep Official Bootleg: 19.12.9 Gusswerk - 2011
Official Bootleg Vol.5: Live in Athens, Greece - 2011
Great British Rock - 2011
Rock Legends - 2011
Icon - 2012
Totally Driven - 2015
Your Turn to Remember - 2016

Personnel 
 David Byron – lead vocals
 Mick Box – lead guitar, acoustic guitar
 Ken Hensley – keyboards, backing vocals
 Paul Newton – bass guitar
 Ian Clarke – drums
 Manfred Mann – Minimoog synthesizer

References

See also

 July Morning

Uriah Heep (band) songs
1971 singles
Songs written by David Byron
Songs written by Ken Hensley
Bronze Records singles
Mercury Records singles
1970 songs